Pål Johannessen (born July 19, 1959) is a Norwegian former child actor.

He is most famous for the role of Basse in the Norwegian Olsenbanden films, though he started off in the film The African in 1966. After leaving the Olsen Gang films in 1976, he quit acting, but made a small cameo in the final Olsen Gang film, Olsenbandens siste stikk (1999). According to Arve Opsahl, who played Egon Olsen in the film, he and Sverre Holm, his co-star, showed up unannounced on Johannessens door, and refused to leave until he agreed to appear in the film. After a brief stalemate, he agreed. This is the only film Johannessen has appeared in as an adult.

Filmography
Olsenbandens siste stikk (1999) as Basse
Olsenbanden for full musikk (1976) as Basse
Olsenbandens siste bedrifter (1975) as Basse
Olsenbanden møter kongen & knekten (1974) as Basse
Olsenbanden og Dynamitt-Harry går amok (1973) as Basse
Olsenbanden tar gull (1972) as Basse
Olsenbanden og Dynamitt-Harry (1970) as Birger
Olsenbanden Operasjon Egon (1969) as Basse
The African (1966) as Lillebror

References

1960s births
Living people
Norwegian male child actors
Norwegian male film actors